Kenneth Layne Collums (born September 15, 1972) is an American college football coach and former player.  He is the offensive coordinator and quarterback coach at the University of Central Arkansas, a position he has held since 2018.  Collums served as the head football coach at Abilene Christian University from 2012 to 2016, compiling a record of 24–32. Prior to his promotion to head coach, for seven seasons he was the Wildcats' offensive coordinator.  As a student-athlete, Collums was a four-year starting quarterback for the Central Arkansas, leading the Bears to the NAIA Division I Football Championship in 1991.

Head coaching record

References

External links
 Central Arkansas profile
 Abilene Christian profile

1972 births
Living people
American football quarterbacks
Abilene Christian Wildcats football coaches
Central Arkansas Bears football coaches
Central Arkansas Bears football players
People from Vernon, Texas